The following lists events that happened during 1795 in Australia.

Leaders
Monarch - George III
Acting Governor of New South Wales – William Paterson
Governor of New South Wales – John Hunter
Lieutenant-Governor of Norfolk Island – Philip Gidley King
Commanding officer of the New South Wales Corps – William Paterson
Inspector of Public Works – John Macarthur

Events
 May or June – The Battle of Richmond Hill takes place between the native Darug people and the New South Wales Corps.
 7 September –  arrives in Sydney. Among the ship's passengers and crew are the Aboriginal Bennelong returning from a visit to England, the surgeon and explorer George Bass, and midshipman Matthew Flinders.
 11 September – Floods devastate the farms at Hawkesbury.
 ? - A tornado strikes Sydney, destroying crops and trees in the early settlement, 1st tornado recorded in the BOM's severe weather archives.

Births
28 April – Charles Sturt
21 July – George Gawler, second Governor of South Australia, born in Southsea.

References

 
Years of the 18th century in Australia